Gutbucket (An Underworld Eruption) is a 1969 sampler album released to promote artists on the Liberty Records label. It was followed later in 1969 by Son of Gutbucket. Both albums were reissued on a single EMI CD in 1994, with an informative booklet, but with 6 the original 31 tracks (from the combined albums) missing.

Track listing

Side 1
 "Gimme Dat Harp Boy" - Captain Beefheart and His Magic Band - from the LP Strictly Personal
 "The Wall" - Hapshash and the Coloured Coat - from the LP The Western Flier
 "You’re Gonna Miss Me" - Lightnin' Hopkins - from the LP Earth Blues
 "I’m Tore Down" - Alexis Korner - from the LP A New Generation of Blues
 "Still a Fool" - Groundhogs - from the LP Scratching the Surface
 "Dismal Swamp" - Nitty Gritty Dirt Band - from the LP Pure Dirt
 "Wine, Women & Whisky" - Papa Lightfoot - from the LP Rural Blues Vol 2

Side two
 "Pony Blues" - Canned Heat - from the LP Living the Blues
 "Down in Texas" - The Hour Glass - from the LP The Hour Glass
 "No More Doggin’" - Tony McPhee - from the LP Me And The Devil
 "Can Blue Men Sing the Whites" - The Bonzo Dog Band - from the LP The Doughnut in Granny's Greenhouse
 "Mamma Don’t Like Me Runnin Around" - Big Joe Williams - from the LP Hand Me Down My Old Walking Stick
 "Rollin’ And Tumblin’" - Jo-Anne Kelly - from the LP Me And The Devil
 "Call Me Woman" - Aynsley Dunbar Retaliation - from the LP Dr. Dunbar’s Prescription

Sampler albums
1969 compilation albums
Blues compilation albums
Rock compilation albums
Liberty Records compilation albums
Record label compilation albums